Temnora subapicalis is a moth of the family Sphingidae. It is known from highland forest in central Kenya and also in Zimbabwe.

The length of the forewings is about 24 mm for males and 26 mm for females. It is similar to Temnora griseata griseata but the upperside of the head has a dark brown median longitudinal crest, the forewing apex and tornus are more acute and the outer margin is more deeply excavated below the apex. The forewing upperside ground colour is dark brown and the pattern of transverse lines is more contrasted.

Subspecies
Temnora subapicalis subapicalis
Temnora subapicalis hayesi Darge, 1975 (Rwanda)

References

Temnora
Moths described in 1903
Moths of Africa